Ilja Zmiejev (Russian: Илья Змеев, Polish: Ilja Zmiejew; born 5 April 1955, Kazan, USSR)  is a Russian and Polish actor, voice-over artist and a former radio host.  He has appeared in more than 60 films,  mostly by Polish film studios.

Biography 
Ilja Zmiejev started his career in show business as a master of ceremonies at Perm Philharmonia after graduating from the School of Performance in Moscow in 1983.

From 1989 until 1991 he worked as a radio host at Avtoradio in Perm. In 1991 he moved with his family to Warsaw, Poland, where he lives to this day.

In Poland Ilja started his acting career, having since appeared in more than 60 films and TV series, including Lapa (1991), Psy 2: Ostatnia krew (1994),  Róża (2011), Katyń (2007) and Jack Strong (2014). He has also performed in theatres. Until 2013 Ilja Zmiejev worked as a radio host for the Polish Radio Russian service.

Apart from his acting Ilja Zmiejev is known for his voice-over work He recorded a number of TV and Internet commercials, including the Russian ads for IKEA and Mastercard. He also records audio books of Russian classics such as the Master and Margarita and Eugene Onegin.

Filmography

Family 
Ilja is married and has two daughters.

References 

1955 births
Living people
Russian male actors
Russian emigrants to Poland
Polish male actors